Gabonese people in France consist of migrants from Gabon and their descendants living and working in France.

History                                      
The first Gabonese immigrants in France came in the 1970s, like the other immigrants from Central Africa, some years after the first immigrant wave from Black Africa (Senegal Valley) in France. There are more immigrants in France from countries which neighbor Gabon (DR Congo, Congo and Cameroon).

See also
 France–Gabon relations

References

African diaspora in France
Society of France
 
Ethnic groups in France
Gabonese diaspora
Immigration to France by country of origin